This is a list of bishops of the United Methodist Church and its predecessor denominations, in order of their election to the episcopacy, both living and dead.

1784–1807
Founders
Thomas Coke 1784
Francis Asbury 1784
Richard Whatcoat 1800
Philip William Otterbein 1800
Martin Boehm 1800
Jacob Albright 1807

1808–1825
William McKendree 1808
Christian Newcomer 1813
Enoch George 1816
Robert Richford Roberts 1816
Andrew Zeller 1817
Joseph Hoffman 1821
Joshua Soule 1824
Elijah Hedding 1824
Henry Kumler Sr 1825

1826–1850
John Emory 1832
James Osgood Andrew 1832
Samuel Heistand 1833
William Brown 1833
Beverly Waugh 1836
Thomas Asbury Morris 1836
Jacob Erb 1837
John Seybert 1839
Henry Kumler Jr 1841
John Coons 1841
Joseph Long 1843
Leonidas Lent Hamline 1844
Edmund Storer Janes 1844
John Russel 1845
Jacob John Glossbrenner 1845
William Hanby 1845
William Capers 1846
Robert Paine 1846
David Edwards 1849
Henry Bidleman Bascom 1850

1851–1875
Levi Scott 1852
Matthew Simpson 1852
Osman Cleander Baker 1852
Edward Raymond Ames 1852
Lewis Davis 1853
George Foster Pierce 1854
John Early 1854
Hubbard Hinde Kavanaugh 1854
Francis Burns 1858
William Wagner Orwig 1859
Jacob Markwood 1861
Daniel Shuck 1861
John Jacob Esher 1863
Davis Wasgatt Clark 1864
Edward Thomson 1864
Calvin Kingsley 1864
Jonathan Weaver 1865
William May Wightman 1866
Enoch Mather Marvin 1866
David Seth Doggett 1866
Holland Nimmons McTyeire 1866
John Wright Roberts 1866
John Dickson 1869
John Christian Keener 1870
Reuben Yeakel 1871
Thomas Bowman 1872
William Logan Harris 1872
Randolph Sinks Foster 1872
Isaac William Wiley 1872
Stephen Mason Merrill 1872
Edward Gayer Andrews 1872
Gilbert Haven 1872
Jesse Truesdell Peck 1872
Rudolph Dubs 1875
Thomas Bowman 1875

1876–1900
Milton Wright 1877
Nicholas Castle 1877
Beniah John Willis 1877
Henry White Warren 1880
Cyrus David Foss 1880
John Fletcher Hurst 1880
Erastus Otis Haven 1880
Ezekiel Boring Kephart 1881
Alpheus Waters Wilson 1882
Linus Parker 1882
John Cowper Granbery 1882
Robert Kennon Hargrove 1882
William Xavier Ninde 1884
John Morgan Walden 1884
Willard Francis Mallalieu 1884
Charles Henry Fowler 1884
William Taylor 1884
Daniel Kumler Flickinger 1885
William Wallace Duncan 1886
Charles Betts Galloway 1886
Eugene Russell Hendrix 1886
Joseph Stanton Key 1886
John Heyl Vincent 1888
James Newbury FitzGerald 1888
Isaac Wilson Joyce 1888
John Philip Newman 1888
Daniel Ayres Goodsell 1888
James Mills Thoburn 1888
James W. Hott 1889
Atticus Greene Haygood 1890
Oscar Penn Fitzgerald 1890
Wesley Matthias Stanford 1891
Christian S. Haman 1891
Sylvanus C. Breyfogel 1891
William Horn 1891
Job S. Mills 1893
Charles Cardwell McCabe 1896
Joseph Crane Hartzell 1896
Earl Cranston 1896
Warren Akin Candler 1898
Henry Clay Morrison 1898
David Hastings Moore 1900
John William Hamilton 1900
Edwin Wallace Parker 1900
Francis Wesley Warne 1900

1901–1912
George Martin Mathews 1902
Alexander Coke Smith 1902
Elijah Embree Hoss 1902
Henry Burns Hartzler 1902
William Franklin Heil 1902
Joseph Flintoft Berry 1904
Henry Spellmeyer 1904
William Fraser McDowell 1904
James Whitford Bashford 1904
William Burt 1904
Luther Barton Wilson 1904
Thomas Benjamin Neely 1904
Isaiah Benjamin Scott 1904
William Fitzjames Oldham 1904
John Edward Robinson 1904
Merriman Colbert Harris 1904
William Marion Weekley 1905
William Mayes Willis 1905
William Melvin Bell 1905
Thomas Coke Carter 1905
John James Tigert III 1906
Seth Ward 1906
James Atkins 1906
Samuel P. Spreng 1907
William Franklin Anderson 1908
John Louis Nuelsen 1908
William Alfred Quayle 1908
Charles William Smith 1908
Wilson Seeley Lewis 1908
Edwin Holt Hughes 1908
Robert McIntyre 1908
Frank Milton Bristol 1908
Collins Denny 1910
John Carlisle Kilgo 1910
William Belton Murrah 1910
Walter Russell Lambuth 1910
Richard Green Waterhouse 1910
Edwin DuBose Mouzon 1910
James Henry McCoy 1910
William Hargrave Fouke 1910
Uriah Frantz Swengel 1910
Homer Clyde Stuntz 1912
William Orville Shepard 1912
Theodore Sommers Henderson 1912
Naphtali Luccock 1912
Francis John McConnell 1912
Frederick DeLand Leete 1912
Richard Joseph Cooke 1912
Wilbur Patterson Thirkield 1912
John Wesley Robinson 1912
William Perry Eveland 1912

1913–1925
Henry Harness Fout 1913
Cyrus Jeffries Kephart 1913
Alfred Taylor Howard 1913
Gottlieb Heinmiller 1915
Lawrence Hoover Seager 1915
Herbert George Welch 1916
Thomas Nicholson 1916
Adna Wright Leonard 1916
Matthew Simpson Hughes 1916
Charles Bayard Mitchell 1916
Franklin Elmer Ellsworth Hamilton 1916
Alexander Priestly Camphor 1916
Eben Samuel Johnson 1916
William H. Washinger 1917
John Moore 1918
William Fletcher McMurry 1918
Urban Valentine Williams Darlington 1918
Horace Mellard DuBose 1918
William Newman Ainsworth 1918
James Cannon Jr 1918
Matthew T. Maze 1918
Lauress John Birney 1920
Frederick Bohn Fisher 1920
Charles Edward Locke 1920
Ernest Lynn Waldorf 1920
Edgar Blake 1920
Ernest Gladstone Richardson 1920
Charles Wesley Burns 1920
Harry Lester Smith 1920
George Harvey Bickley 1920
Frederick Thomas Keeney 1920
Charles Larew Mead 1920
Anton Bast 1920
Robert Elijah Jones 1920
Matthew Wesley Clair 1920
Arthur R. Clippinger 1921
William Benjamin Beauchamp 1922
James Edward Dickey 1922
Samuel Ross Hay 1922
Hoyt McWhorter Dobbs 1922
Hiram Abiff Boaz 1922
John Francis Dunlap 1922
George Amos Miller 1924
Titus Lowe 1924
George Richmond Grose 1924
Brenton Thoburn Badley 1924
Wallace Elias Brown 1924
Arthur Biggs Statton 1925

1926–1938
John S. Stamm 1926
Samuel J. Umbreit 1926
Raymond J. Wade 1928
James Chamberlain Baker 1928
Edwin Ferdinand Lee 1928
Grant D. Batdorf 1929
Ira David Warner 1929
John W. Gowdy 1930
Chih Ping Wang 1930
Arthur James Moore 1930
Paul Bentley Kern 1930
Angie Frank Smith 1930
George Edward Epp 1930
Jashwant Rao Chitambar 1931
Juan Ermete Gattinoni 1932
Junius Ralph Magee 1932
Ralph Spaulding Cushman 1932
Elmer Wesley Praetorius 1934
Charles H. Stauffacher 1934
Jarrell Waskom Pickett 1935
Roberto Valenzuela Elphick 1936
Wilbur Emery Hammaker 1936
Charles Wesley Flint 1936
Garfield Bromley Oxnam 1936
Alexander Preston Shaw 1936
John McKendree Springer 1936
F. H. Otto Melle 1936
Ralph Ansel Ward 1937
Victor Otterbein Weidler 1938
Ivan Lee Holt 1938
William Walter Peele 1938
Clare Purcell 1938
Charles Claude Selecman 1938
John Lloyd Decell 1938
William Clyde Martin 1938
William Turner Watkins 1938

1939–1950
James Henry Straughn 1939
John Calvin Broomfield 1939
William Alfred Carroll Hughes 1940
Lorenzo Houston King 1940
Bruce Richard Baxter 1940
Shot Kumar Mondol 1940
Clement Daniel Rockey 1941
Enrique Carlos Balloch 1941
Z. T. Kaung 1941
Wen Yuan Chen 1941
George Carleton Lacy 1941
Fred L. Dennis 1941
Dionisio Deista Alejandro 1944
Fred Pierce Corson 1944
Walter Earl Ledden 1944
Lewis Oliver Hartman 1944
Newell Snow Booth 1944
Willis Jefferson King 1944
Robert Nathaniel Brooks 1944
Edward Wendall Kelly 1944
William Angie Smith 1944
Paul Elliott Martin 1944
Costen Jordan Harrell 1944
Paul Neff Garber 1944
Charles Wesley Brashares 1944
Schuyler Edward Garth 1944
Arthur Frederick Wesley 1944
John Abdus Subhan 1945
John Balmer Showers 1945
August Theodor Arvidson 1946
Johann Wilhelm Ernst Sommer 1946
John Wesley Edward Bowen 1948
Lloyd Christ Wicke 1948
John Wesley Lord 1948
Dana Dawson 1948
Marvin Augustus Franklin 1948
Roy Hunter Short 1948
Richard Campbell Raines 1948
Marshall Russell Reed 1948
Harry Clifford Northcott 1948
Hazen Graff Werner 1948
Glenn Randall Phillips 1948
Gerald Hamilton Kennedy 1948
Donald Harvey Tippett 1948
Jose Labarrete Valencia 1948
Sante Uberto Barbieri 1949
Raymond LeRoy Archer 1950
David Thomas Gregory 1950

1951–1963
Frederick Buckley Newell 1952
Edgar Amos Love 1952
Matthew Wesley Clair Jr. 1952
John Warren Branscomb 1952
Henry Bascom Watts 1952
D. Stanley Coors 1952
Edwin Edgar Voigt 1952
Francis Gerald Ensley 1952
Alsie Raymond Grant 1952
Julio Manuel Sabanes 1952
Friedrich Wunderlich 1953
Odd Arthur Hagen 1953
Ferdinand Sigg 1954
Reuben Herbert Mueller 1954
Harold Rickel Heininger 1954
Lyle Lynden Baughman 1954
Prince Albert Taylor Jr. 1956
Eugene Maxwell Frank 1956
Nolan Bailey Harmon 1956
Bachman Gladstone Hodge 1956
Hobart Baumann Amstutz 1956
Ralph Edward Dodge 1956
Mangal Singh 1956
Gabriel Sundaram 1956
Paul Eugene Virgil Shannon 1957
John Gordon Howard 1957
Hermann Walter Kaebnickv 1958
W. Maynard Sparks 1958
Paul Murray Herrick 1958
Bowman Foster Stockwell 1960
Fred Garrigus Holloway 1960
William Vernon Middleton 1960
W. Ralph Ward 1960
James Kenneth Mathews 1960
Oliver Eugene Slater 1960
William Kenneth Pope 1960
Paul Vernon Galloway 1960
Aubrey Grey Walton 1960
Kenneth Wilford Copeland 1960
Everett Walter Palmer 1960
Ralph Taylor Alton 1960
Edwin Ronald Garrison 1960
Torney Otto Nall Jr. 1960
Charles Franklin Golden 1960
Noah Watson Moore Jr. 1960
Marquis LaFayette Harris 1960
James Walton Henley 1960
Walter Clark Gum 1960
Paul Hardin Jr. 1960
John Owen Smith 1960
Paul William Milhouse 1960
Pedro Ricardo Zottele 1962

1964–1975
James Samuel Thomas 1964
William McFerrin Stowe 1964
Walter Kenneth Goodson 1964
Dwight Ellsworth Loder 1964
Robert Marvin Stuart 1964
Edward Julian Pendergrass Jr 1964
Thomas Marion Pryor 1964
Homer Ellis Finger Jr 1964
Earl Gladstone Hunt Jr 1964
Francis Enmer Kearns 1964
Lance Webb 1964
Escrivao Anglaze Zunguze 1964
Robert Fielden Lundy 1964
Harry Peter Andreassen 1964
John Wesley Shungu 1964
Alfred Jacob Shaw 1965
Prabhakar Christopher Benjamin Balaram 1965
Stephen Trowen Nagbe 1965
Franz Werner Schäfer 1966
Benjamin I. Guansing 1967
Lineunt Scott Allen 1967
Paul Arthur Washburn 1968
Carl Ernst Sommer 1968
David Frederick Wertz 1968
Alsie Henry Carleton 1968
Roy Calvin Nichols 1968
Arthur James Armstrong 1968 (resigned 1983)
William Ragsdale Cannon 1968
Abel Tendekayi Muzorewa 1968
Cornelio M. Ferrer 1968
Paul Locke A. Granadosin 1968
Joseph R. Lance 1968
Ram Dutt Joshi 1968
Eric Algernon Mitchell 1969
Federico Jose Pagura 1969
Armin E. Haertel 1970
Ole Edvard Borgen 1970
Finis Alonzo Crutchfield, Jr. 1972
Joseph Hughes Yeakel 1972
Robert E. Goodrich Jr 1972
Carl Julian Sanders 1972
Ernest T. Dixon Jr 1972
Don Wendell Holter 1972
Wayne K. Clymer 1972
Joel David McDavid 1972
Edward Gonzalez Carroll 1972
Jesse Robert DeWitt 1972
James Mase Ault 1972
John B. Warman 1972
Mack B. Stokes 1972
Jack Tuell 1972
Melvin E. Wheatley Jr 1972
Edward Lewis Tullis 1972
Frank Lewis Robertson 1972
Wilbur Wong Yan Choy 1972
Robert McGrady Blackburn 1972
Emilio J. M. de Carvalho 1972
Fama Onema 1972  Bishop Joseph Fama Onema is a retired Congolese Bishop of United Methodist Church, elected to that office in 1972.
Mamidi Elia Peter 1972
Bennie de Quency Warner 1973

1976–1988
J. Kenneth Shamblin 1976
Alonzo Monk Bryan 1976
Kenneth William Hicks 1976
James Chess Lovern 1976
Leroy Charles Hodapp 1976
Edsel Albert Ammons 1976
C. Dale White 1976
Ngoy Kimba Wakadilo 1976
Almeida Penicela 1976
LaVerne D. Mercado 1976
Hermann Ludwig Sticher 1977
Shantu Kumar A. Parmar 1979
Thomas Syla Bangura 1979
John Alfred Ndoricimpa 1980
William Talbot Handy Jr 1980
John Wesley Hardt 1980
Benjamin Ray Oliphint 1980
Louis Wesley Schowengerdt 1980
Melvin George Talbert 1980
Paul Andrews Duffey 1980
Edwin Charles Boulton 1980
John William Russell 1980
Fitz Herbert Skeete 1980
George Willis Bashore 1980
Roy Clyde Clark 1980
William Boyd Grove 1980
Emerson Stephen Colaw 1980
Marjorie Matthews 1980
Carlton Printess Minnick Jr 1980
Calvin Dale McConnell 1980
Kainda Katembo 1980
Emerito P. Nacpil 1980
Arthur Flumo Kulah 1980
Late Bishop Dr. Karriappa Samuel is first Bishop of Methodist Church in India 1981
Felton Edwin May 1984
Ernest A. Fitzgerald 1984
R. Kern Eutsler 1984
J. Woodrow Hearn 1984
Walter L. Underwood 1984
Richard B. Wilke 1984
J. Lloyd Knox 1984
Neil L. Irons 1984
Roy I. Sano 1984
Lewis Bevel Jones III 1984
Forrest C. Stith 1984
Ernest W. Newman 1984
Woodie W. White 1984
Robert Crawley Morgan 1984
David J. Lawson 1984
Elias Gabriel Galvan 1984
Rueben Philip Job 1984
Leontine T. Kelly 1984
Judith Craig 1984
Rüdiger Rainer Minor 1986
Eugenio Poma Anaguña 1986
Jose Castro Gamboa Jr 1986
Thomas Barber Stockton 1988
Harold Hasbrouck Hughes Jr 1988
Richard Carl Looney 1988
Robert Hitchcock Spain 1988
Susan Murch Morrison 1988
R. Sheldon Duecker 1988
Joseph Benjamin Bethea 1988
William B. Oden 1988
Bruce P. Blake 1988
Charles Wilbourne Hancock 1988
Clay Foster Lee Jr 1988
Sharon A. Brown Christopher 1988
Dan E. Solomon 1988
William B. Lewis 1988
William W. Dew Jr 1988
Moises Domingos Fernandes 1988
Joao Somane Machado 1988

1989–2000
Walter Klaiber 1989
Heinrich Bolleter 1989
Hans Vaxby 1989
Alfred Lloyd Norris 1992
Joe Allen Wilson 1992
Robert Eugene Fannin 1992
Amelia Ann B. Sherer 1992
Albert Frederick Mutti 1992
Raymond Harold Owen 1992
Joel Nestali Martinez 1992
Donald Arthur Ott 1992
Kenneth Lee Carder 1992
Hae Jong Kim 1992 (resigned 2005)
William Wesley Morris 1992
Marshall Leroy Meadors Jr 1992
Charles Wesley Jordan 1992
Sharon Zimmerman Rader 1992
S. Clifton Ives 1992
Mary Ann Swenson 1992
Done Peter Dabale 1992
Joseph Christian Humper 1992
Christopher Jokomo 1992
Daniel C. Arichea Jr 1994
G. Lindsey Davis 1996
Joseph E. Pennel Jr 1996
Charlene P. Kammerer 1996
Alfred Johnson  1996
Cornelius L. Henderson 1996
Susan Wolfe Hassinger 1996
J. Lawrence McCleskey 1996
Ernest S. Lyght 1996
Janice Riggle Huie 1996
Marion M. Edwards 1996
C. Joseph Sprague 1996
Peter D. Weaver 1996
Jonathan D. Keaton 1996
Ray Chamberlain 1996
John L. Hopkins 1996
Michael J. Coyner 1996
Edward W. Paup	1996 (resigned 2008 to accept General Secretariat of Board of Global Missions)
Ntambo Nkulu Ntanda 1996
Larry M. Goodpaster 2000
Rhymes H. Moncure Jr 2000
Beverly J. Shamana 2000
Violet L. Fisher 2000
Gregory V. Palmer 2000
William W. Hutchinson 2000
B. Michael Watson 2000
D. Max Whitfield 2000
Benjamin Roy Chamness 2000
Linda Lee 2000
James R. King 2000
Bruce R. Ough 2000
Warner H. Brown Jr 2000
José Quipungo 2000
Gaspar Joao Domingos 2000
Leo A. Soriano 2000
Benjamin A. Justo 2000
John G. Innis 2000
Carlos Intipampa 2000

2001–2007
Timothy W. Whitaker 2001
Øystein Olsen 2001
Solito K. Toquero 2001
Nélida (Nelly) Ritchie 2001
Marcus Matthews 2004
Sudarshana Devadhar 2004
Jeremiah J. Park 2004
Hope Morgan Ward 2004
William H. Willimon 2004
James E. Swanson Sr 2004
Hee-soo Jung 2004
Robert E. Hayes Jr 2004
Alfred W. Gwinn Jr 2004
John R. Schol 2004
Richard J. Wills Jr 2004
Robert C. Schnase 2004
Deborah L. Kiesey 2004
Jane Allen Middleton 2004
Thomas J. Bickerton 2004
Scott J. Jones 2004
Charles N. Crutchfield 2004
Robert T. Hoshibata 2004
Mary Virginia Taylor 2004
Sally Dyck 2004
Minerva G. Carcaño 2004
Eben K. Nhiwatiwa 2004
Carlos Poma 2004
Hans Växby 2005
David Kekumba Yemba 2005
Rosemarie Wenner 2005
Benjamin Boni 2005
Patrick Streiff 2005
Daniel Wandabula 2006
Kefas Kane Mavula 2007

Elected July 2008
Paul Leeland 2008
Peggy Johnson 2008
W. Earl Bledsoe 2008
John Michael Lowry 2008
Julius C. Trimble 2008
Grant J. Hagiya 2008
Elaine J. W. Stanovsky 2008
James Dorff 2008
Joaquina Filipe Nhanala 2008
Rodolfo Alfonso Juan 2008
Lito Cabacungan Tangonan 2008
John K. Yambasu 2008

Elected July 2012
Jonathan Holston 2012
Kenneth H. Carter, Jr. 2012
Sandra Steiner-Ball 2012
Bill McAlilly 2012
Deborah Wallace-Padgett 2012
Martin McLee 2012
Young Jin Cho 2012
Cynthia Fierro Harvey 2012
Mark Webb 2012
Gary Mueller 2012
Mike McKee 2012
 John Wesley Yohanna 2012

Elected July 2016
Karen Oliveto 2016
Tracy Smith Malone 2016
Frank Beard 2016
David Bard 2016
Laurie Haller 2016
Cynthia Moore-Koikoi 2016
LaTrelle Easterling 2016
Ruben Saenz, Jr. 2016
James G. Nunn 2016
Robert Farr 2016
Sharma Lewis 2016
David Graves 2016
Leonard Fairley 2016
Sue Haupert-Johnson 2016
R. Lawson Bryan 2016
Gabriel Unda Yemba 2016

Elected November 2022 

 Delores Williamston, 2022
 David Wilson, 2022
 Laura Merrill, 2022
 Robin Dease, 2022
 Connie Mitchell Shelton, 2022
 Thomas M. Berlin, 2022
 Dan Schwerin, 2022
 Lanette Plambeck, 2022
 Kennetha Bigham-Tsai, 2022
 Héctor A. Burgos-Núñez, 2022
 Dottie Escobedo-Frank, 2022
 Cedrick D. Bridgeforth, 2022
 Carlo A. Rapanut, 2022

See also
Conferences of the United Methodist Church
Methodism
United Methodist Church
Bishop
Lists of patriarchs, archbishops, and bishops

References

 

Methodist